Biologics: Targets and Therapy is a peer-reviewed medical journal covering research on the clinical application of biologic agents in the management of pathologies where a molecular target can be identified. The journal was established in 2007 and is published by Dove Medical Press.

External links 
 

English-language journals
Open access journals
Dove Medical Press academic journals
Pathology journals
Publications established in 2007